Carrum railway station is located on the Frankston line in Victoria, Australia. It serves the south-eastern Melbourne suburb of Carrum, and opened on 1 August 1882.

History
Carrum station opened on 1 August 1882, when the railway line from Mordialloc was extended to Frankston. Like the suburb itself, the station was named after the nearby Carrum Swamp, the name believed to be derived from an Indigenous word describing a boomerang.

In 1947, interlocked gates were installed at the former Station Street level crossing, which was at the up end of the station, and was the last installation of interlocking gates in Victoria. In 1977, boom barriers replaced these gates.

In 1988, siding "A" and the goods platform was abolished, as well as the connection from siding "B" to the mainline.

Approximately 100 metres south of the station was a stabling yard that could hold a number of trains. The yard, which was provided in 1990, was replaced due to the level crossing removal works, being relocating to Kananook in May 2020.

On 20 December 1995, Carrum was upgraded to a Premium Station. In October 2015, additional shelters were provided, along with an upgrade of the toilets on the former ground level Platform 1.

A signal box was located on the former ground level Platform 1, controlling a crossover which allowed trains to terminate and either return or shunt into the stabling yard. In 1976, the interlocked frame at the signal box was abolished, and was replaced by a control panel. On 20 July 2019, the signal box was abolished.

During 2019-2020, the station was rebuilt as part of the Level Crossing Removal Project. On 17 May 2019, the Station Street level crossing was abolished, and was followed by the closure of the station in the early hours of 6 July of that year, with a small number of enthusiasts witnessing the last trains. The station buildings were demolished shortly afterwards. On 17 February 2020, a new elevated rail line and station opened.

Platforms and services
Carrum has one island platform with two faces. It is served by Frankston line trains.

Platform 1:
  all stations and limited express services to Flinders Street, Werribee and Williamstown

Platform 2:
  all stations services to Frankston

Transport links
Ventura Bus Lines operates four routes via Carrum station, under contract to Public Transport Victoria:
 : to Hampton station
 : to Frankston station
 : Chelsea station – Dandenong station
 : to Frankston station

Gallery

References

External links

 Melway map at street-directory.com.au

Premium Melbourne railway stations
Railway stations in Melbourne
Railway stations in Australia opened in 1882
Railway stations in the City of Kingston (Victoria)